Ãtel is Bengali term referring to a person who is proficient in academic practice but lacks practical knowledge, or someone who pretends to be intelligent.

Use
According to Indian author Nrisingh Prasad Vauduri, winner of the Sahitya Akademi Award,

In the May 2017, the Prime Minister of Bangladesh Sheikh Hasina said in the session of parliament pointing towards the rescued social activist and author Farhad Mazhar after the disappearance: 

Former chairman of the Department of Language Studies of Shahjalal University of Science and Technology, Shafiuddin Ahmed said in response to the question of "how much our generation is progressive":

Indian film director Raj Chakraborty, in his interview, mentioned the word in the answer of "what types of films will you use to choose to make as a producer", he said,

See also
Egghead
Obrazovanshchina

References

Anti-intellectualism
Pejorative terms for people
Bengali words and phrases